Until 1972, Tripura was a Union Territory. The 1967 Tripura Legislative Assembly election took place on 21 February 1967 in a single phase to elect the Members of the Legislative Assembly (MLA) from each of the 30 Assembly Constituencies (ACs) in Tripura, India.

Indian National Congress led by Sachindra Lal Singh, won 27 seats and formed a Government in Tripura union territory.

Highlights
Election to the Tripura Legislative Assembly were held on February 21, 1967.  The election were held in a single phase for all the 30 assembly constituencies.

Participating Political Parties

No. of Constituencies

Electors

Performance of Women Candidates

Result

Constituency wise winners

Government formation
Indian National Congress,(INC) won a majority of the 30 seats in the assembly.  Sachindra Lal Singh of the INC continued as Chief Minister.

References

State Assembly elections in Tripura
Tripura